Hendiz (also Romanized as Hendīz) is a village in Pariz Rural District, Pariz District, Sirjan County, Kerman Province, Iran. At the 2006 census, its population was 22 inhabitants, in 6 families.

References 

Populated places in Sirjan County